Sokoto South is a Local Government Area in Sokoto State, Nigeria. Its headquarters is in Sarkin Zamfara.

It has an area of 41 km and a population of 194,914 at the 2006 census.

The postal code of the area is 840.

References

Local Government Areas in Sokoto State